Clasmodosaurus (meaning "fragmentary tooth reptile") is a genus of titanosaurian sauropod dinosaur from the Bajo Barreal Formation. It lived during the Late Cretaceous in what is now Argentina. It is known only from three fossilized teeth, and is therefore a tooth taxon. It is a nomen dubium.

The type species, Clasmodosaurus spatula, was described by Argentine paleontologist Florentino Ameghino in 1898. For a long time, these teeth were thought to belong to a theropod. The teeth of Clasmodosaurus spatula were polygonal in cross section rather than round, an unusual trait also found in the titanosaur Bonitasaura salgadoi.

History 
Clasmodosaurus was named by Florentino Ameghino in 1898, but remained largely unknown for decades after its discovery. It was originally considered a sauropod, but Friedrich von Huene suggested that it could be a coelurosaur or synonymous with Loncosaurus, which he considered to be a carnosaur. Like Loncosaurus, its taxonomy remained unclear with it regarded as a theropod on the rare occasions it was mentioned. However, Jaime Powell suggested that it was a dubious genus of sauropod in 1986, an identification which has been accepted since. Like diplodocoids and titanosaurs, it had narrow tooth crowns, and it is typically regarded as a titanosaur like most Late Cretaceous sauropods.

References 

Titanosaurs
Late Cretaceous dinosaurs of South America
Cretaceous Argentina
Fossils of Argentina
Fossil taxa described in 1898
Taxa named by Florentino Ameghino
Nomina dubia